Radošovce is a village and municipality of Trnava District in the Trnava region of Slovakia.

References

External links
http://en.e-obce.sk/obec/radosovce/radosovce.html
http://www.statistics.sk/mosmis/eng/run.html
https://web.archive.org/web/20101113055135/http://www.mesta-obce.sk/trnavsky-kraj/okres-trnava/radosovce/ 

Villages and municipalities in Trnava District